Myles Moylan (December 17, 1838 – December 11, 1909) was a United States Army officer with an extensive military career, which included the battle of Gettysburg, and the battle of the Little Bighorn. He was awarded the Medal of Honor for his gallantry in leadership at the Battle of Bear Paw.

Early life
Myles Moylan was born on December 17, 1838. Some sources say he was born in Amesbury, Massachusetts, while other sources say he was born in Tuam, County Galway, Ireland.

His parents were Thomas Moylan and Margaret Riley Moylan. He worked as a shoemaker until he enlisted as a private in the U.S. Army on June 8, 1857, and was assigned to the 2nd U.S. Dragoons. He was promoted to corporal on October 1, 1858, to sergeant in October 1860, then to first sergeant on May 17, 1861.

American Civil War
Moylan's first battle, the Battle of Wilson's Creek in Missouri, was fought on August 10, 1861. Moylan also participated in the Battle of Fort Henry, Tennessee, on February 6, 1862, and in the Battle of Fort Donelson, Tennessee, on February 11–16, 1862. Then the Battle of Shiloh, Tennessee, April 6–7, 1862, and the Siege of Corinth, Mississippi, from April 29 – May 30, 1862. On March 28, 1863, Moylan was promoted to the rank of second lieutenant in the 5th United States Cavalry. In this organization he fought in the Battle of Gettysburg, Pennsylvania, July 1–3, 1863.  On October 25, 1863, Lieutenant Moylan was dismissed from the service for being AWOL (absent without leave) in Washington, D.C. He then enlisted under the assumed name of Charles Thomas into the 4th Massachusetts Volunteer Cavalry Regiment on December 2, 1863. Moylan was appointed a sergeant in that regiment on December 26, 1863, a first lieutenant, then a captain on December 1, 1864. He was then brevetted to the rank of major on April 9, 1865, and mustered out in November 1865.  After the war, he was elected as a companion of the California Commandery of the Military Order of the Loyal Legion of the United States.

Indian wars

In January 1866, Moylan again enlisted as a private into the United States Army, and on September 1, 1866, was appointed the regimental sergeant major of the newly formed 7th United States Cavalry Regiment, then was promoted to a first lieutenant in December 1866. He participated in 1868 Washita Campaign, and was present at the Washita Massacre, in present-day Oklahoma, on November 27, 1868. Moylan was then again promoted to the rank of captain in March 1872, and the same year married Charlotte "Lottie" Calhoun on October 22, 1872, at Madison, Indiana; they had no children. She was the sister of Lieutenant James Calhoun, the brother-in-law of George Custer, who was killed in the Battle of Little Bighorn. Moylan participated in the Yellowstone Expedition of 1873, and in the Black Hills Expedition of 1874. Captain Moylan again fought with the 7th Cavalry, at the Battle of the Little Bighorn, Montana Territory, on June 25–26, 1876, as the commander of Company A (which was part of the battalion placed under the command of Major Marcus Reno). He was awarded the Medal of Honor for his actions on September 30, 1877, during the Battle of Bear Paw, Montana Territory. Moylan was also present at the Wounded Knee Massacre, in South Dakota, on December 29, 1890. Moylan was promoted to Major in April 1892, and retired in 1893.

Later life

After Moylan retired, he settled in San Diego, where he had a home built. That house was designed by architects Irving Gill and Joseph Falkenham, and is now on the National Register of Historic Places. Moylan died at his home on December 11, 1909, from cancer.

Medal of Honor citation
The President of the United States of America, in the name of Congress, takes pleasure in presenting the Medal of Honor to Captain Myles Moylan, United States Army, for extraordinary heroism.

Rank and organization: Captain, Company A, 7th United States Cavalry Regiment. Place and date: At Bear Paw Mountain, Montana, September 30, 1877. Entered service at: United States. Born: December 17, 1838. Date of issue: November 27, 1894.

Citation:
"Captain Moylan gallantly led his command in action against Nez Perce Indians until he was severely wounded".

See also
 7th United States Cavalry Regiment
 List of Medal of Honor recipients for the Indian Wars

References

American Indian Wars recipients of the Medal of Honor
1838 births
1909 deaths
United States Army officers
United States Army Medal of Honor recipients
Battle of the Little Bighorn
Pine Ridge Campaign